A farmers' market (or farmers market according to the AP stylebook) is a physical retail marketplace intended to sell foods directly by farmers to consumers.

Farmers' market or farmers market may refer to:
 Farmers Market (band), a Norwegian band
 Farmer's Market (album), an album by trumpeter Art Farmer recorded in 1956
 The Farmer's Market, a former online black market for illegal drugs
 99 Ranch Market, some stores branded as "Farmer's Market"